Condylidium is a genus of flowering plants in the family Asteraceae.

 Species
 Condylidium cuatrecasasii R.M.King & H.Rob. - Colombia
 Condylidium iresinoides (Kunth) R.M.King & H.Rob. - Central America, West Indies, South America, Florida

References

Eupatorieae
Asteraceae genera